2 World Trade Center (2 WTC; also known as 200 Greenwich Street) is a planned skyscraper as part of the World Trade Center complex in Manhattan, New York City. It will replace the original 2 World Trade Center, which was completed in 1972 and subsequently destroyed during the September 11 attacks in 2001, and it will occupy the position of the original 5 World Trade Center. The foundation work was completed in 2013.

Original building (1973–2001)

When completed in 1973, 2 World Trade Center (the South Tower) became the second tallest building in the World – behind its twin, 1 World Trade Center. Throughout its existence, however, the South Tower had more floors (at 110) than any other building. This number was not surpassed until the advent of the  Burj Khalifa, which opened in 2010.

Of the 110 stories, eight were set aside for technical services in mechanical floors (floors 7/8, 41/42, 75/76, and 108/109), which were four two-floor areas that evenly spaced up the building. All the remaining floors were free for open-plan offices. Each floor of the towers had  of space for occupancy. The original Two World Trade Center had 95 express and local elevators. The tower had  of office space.

Initially conceived as a complex dedicated to companies and organizations directly taking part in "world trade", the South Tower, along with 1 World Trade Center (also known as the North Tower) at first failed to attract the expected clientele. During the early years, various governmental organizations became key tenants of the World Trade Center towers including the State of New York. It was not until the 1980s that the city's perilous financial state eased, after which an increasing number of private companies – mostly financial firms tied to Wall Street — became tenants. During the 1990s, approximately 500 companies had offices in the complex including many financial companies such as Morgan Stanley, Aon, Salomon Brothers and the Port Authority itself. The basement concourse of the World Trade Center included The Mall at the World Trade Center, along with a PATH station.

Electrical service to the towers was supplied by Consolidated Edison (ConEd) at 13,800 volts. This service passed through the World Trade Center Primary Distribution Center (PDC) and sent up through the core of the building to electrical substations located on the mechanical floors. The substations stepped down the 13,800 primary voltage to 480/277 volt secondary service, and then further down to 208/120 volt general power and lighting service. The complex also was served by emergency generators located in the sub-levels of the towers and on the roof of 5 WTC.

The 110th floor of 1 World Trade Center (the North Tower) housed radio and television transmission equipment; access to the roof of 1 WTC was controlled from the WTC Operations Control Center (OCC) located in the B1 level of 2 WTC.

At 9:03 a.m. EDT on September 11, 2001, five terrorists crashed United Airlines Flight 175 into the southern facade of the South Tower. Three buildings in the World Trade Center complex, including 2 WTC, collapsed due to fire-induced structural failure. The light construction and hollow nature of the structures allowed the jet fuel to penetrate far inside the towers, igniting many large fires simultaneously over a wide area of the impacted floors.  The fuel from the planes burned at most for a few minutes, but the contents of the buildings burned over the next hour to hour and a half.

The fires might not have been as centrally positioned, nor as intense, had traditionally heavy high-rise construction been standing in the way of the aircraft. Debris and fuel would likely have remained mostly outside the buildings or concentrated in more peripheral areas away from the building cores, which would then not have become unique failure points.  In this scenario, the towers might have stood far longer, perhaps indefinitely. The fires were hot enough to weaken the columns and cause floors to sag, pulling perimeter columns inward and reducing their ability to support the mass of the building above. The South Tower collapsed at 9:59 a.m. after burning for 56 minutes in the fire caused by the impact of United Airlines Flight 175 and the explosion of its fuel.

New building

Site redevelopment 
Larry Silverstein had leased the original World Trade Center from the PANYNJ in July 2001. His company Silverstein Properties continued to pay rent on the site even after the September 11 attacks. In the months following the attacks, architects and urban planning experts held meetings and forums to discuss ideas for rebuilding the site. The architect Daniel Libeskind won a competition to design the master plan for the new World Trade Center in February 2003. The master plan included five towers, a  9/11 memorial, and a transportation hub. By July 2004, the 65-story 2 World Trade Center was being proposed for the northeast corner of the site. The plans were delayed due to disputes over who would redevelop the five towers. The PANYNJ and Silverstein ultimately reached an agreement in 2006. Silverstein Properties ceded the rights to develop 1 and 5 WTC in exchange for financing with Liberty Bonds for 2, 3, and 4 WTC.

British architect Norman Foster of Foster and Partners was hired to design the new 2 World Trade Center, on the northeastern part of the World Trade Center site at 200 Greenwich Street, in May 2006. Meanwhile, Richard Rogers and Fumihiko Maki were selected as the architects for 3 and 4 World Trade Center, respectively. The plans for 2, 3, and 4 World Trade Center were announced in September 2006. 2 World Trade Center would be a 78-story,  building, rising to a pinnacle with four diamonds. The lowest stories of 2 World Trade Center and several neighboring buildings would be part of a rebuilt Westfield World Trade Center Mall.

In Foster and Partners' original design, the structural engineer for the building was WSP Cantor Seinuk. The four diamonds on the roof would have sloped down toward the memorial, indicating the sites of the original towers on the skyline. The tower was designed to resemble a diamond, with cross bracing and indentations breaking up each elevation of the facade. The Port Authority of New York and New Jersey said that Foster's design "incorporates WTC master planner Daniel Libeskind's 'wedge of light' concept, and will cast no shadow on the memorial park on September 11."

Construction
Excavation for 200 Greenwich Street commenced in 2008, at which point the building was scheduled to be completed sometime between 2011 and 2016. By May 2009, the Port Authority was seeking to reduce the size of 2 and 3 WTC and postpone the construction of 5 WTC, citing the Great Recession and disagreements with Silverstein. The developer had requested that the Port Authority fund two of the towers, but the agency wanted to take control of the 3 WTC site and was willing to provide funding for only one tower. New York City mayor Michael Bloomberg attempted to mediate the dispute with little success. In July 2009, Silverstein wrote a letter to the development's stakeholders, recommending that the dispute go to arbitration. Silverstein officially requested arbitration the next month. He requested that the Port Authority pay $2.7 billion in damages. An arbitration panel ruled in January 2010 that the agency did not owe him any damages. However, the panel also voided a clause that would have forced Silverstein to hand over the towers to Port Authority if they were not completed by 2014. 

As part of the arbitration process, Silverstein requested a $2.6 billion tax-free bond issue for the redevelopment of the World Trade Center site. The New York state government approved the bond issue in December 2009, though the construction of 2 and 3 WTC remained on hold. In February 2010, Silverstein proposed constructing 3 WTC and delaying plans for 2 WTC, a move that was expected to save $262 million in the short term. The next month, the PANYNJ and the city and state governments of New York agreed to fund $600 million for 3 WTC's construction after Silverstein had found tenants for at least  of the space. Silverstein would build the first five stories by 2013 if he were unable to finance the project and lease the office space. PANYNJ board members from New Jersey acquiesced to the deal with Silverstein, but only on the condition that the agency also fund a reconstruction of the Bayonne Bridge.

Tower 2 foundation work began on June 1, 2010, but construction was halted in August 2012. The street-level foundation was finished by November 2012 and construction of everything up to street level was completed in mid-2013. The rest of the building, however, has yet to be built unless tenants for Tower 2 could be found. Larry Silverstein said in a 2019 interview that he was considering building the tower without a signed tenant. He stated, "For all intents and purposes, it wouldn't be a bad idea to start on Tower 2 because it won't be finished until about 2022, 2023.

Redesigns

Bjarke Ingels Group

On June 9, 2015, Wired magazine reported that Two World Trade Center would be redesigned by Bjarke Ingels of Bjarke Ingels Group (BIG), and be built by 2021. The bottom half of the new design would have been leased out to 21st Century Fox and News Corp until they decided against leaving their current headquarters.

Bjarke Ingels Group began redesigning 2 World Trade Center in May 2015, upon the requests of the property's developer Silverstein Properties and its possible future media tenants. The project's redesign was warranted since financial firms had since migrated away from the Financial District, making leasing out the new buildings a struggle and further prolonging the World Trade Center's redevelopment. Financial firms were the intended occupants for Foster and Partners' 2 World Trade Center, and the original proposal's sky lobby design was not attractive to media tenants, who have been the leading tenants of the new WTC towers and were expected to occupy BIG's redesigned building.

This design featured a cantilevering structure viewed from a northern perspective, but a terraced structure from an eastern perspective. From the south and west, the building's profile was vertically straight, but appeared to be leaning slightly toward One World Trade Center because of the cantilevering design. In an interview, Bjarke Ingels described the concept of the redesign as such: "Two World Trade is almost like a vertical village of bespoke buildings within the building, that also can be seen as a single tower. It actually has an inclination towards One World Trade Center, so the two towers – even though they're not twinning – by having a mutual relationship, the space between them is parallel, although at an incline." The tower had also been described to integrate Tribeca with the Financial District, as the design's cantilevers and terraces resembled the modern architecture known of the neighborhood.

The tower would have been the second–tallest skyscraper on the World Trade Center site, following One World Trade Center.

Return to Foster and Partners 
After the pulling out of News Corp and 21st Century Fox, the future of the site became uncertain, with calls for the tower's design to be reverted to its original incarnation. In a press interview, site developer Larry Silverstein signaled that both the Foster and BIG site plans were under consideration, and that a choice between the two would be made by a future prospective tenant. In February 2019, Silverstein suggested in an interview that construction may soon begin "on spec", or without an anchor tenant, given the strong economy and leasing progress made on neighboring towers. In January 2020, Silverstein announced that he and Norman Foster were working together to update Foster's original design, and that it would be "significantly modified to be more reflective of contemporary needs and taste". In 2021, a Silverstein spokesperson announced that the skyscraper is "being redesigned by Foster & Partners to be the healthiest and most sustainable building on the planet.” Renderings of a redesigned Foster and Partners design were published in early 2022.

Possible tenants

In 2013, Citigroup had shortlisted the tower as one of three potential locations for its headquarters for when its lease on 399 Park Avenue expired in 2017. The company eventually chose nearby 388 Greenwich Street, however: a building that it already had under lease.

Silverstein has faced considerable difficulty in persuading tenants to lease floor space in Two World Trade Center. Most commonly, businesses ultimately decide against doing so because of the costs of moving in, but others prefer their current locations in Midtown Manhattan despite the leases sometimes being more costly, since Midtown Manhattan offers easier access to the Upper East Side, North Jersey, Long Island, Westchester, and Connecticut. Silverstein has tried to appeal to the Downtown's proximity to nearby Brooklyn, the residence of many technology and media companies' employees. At present, prospective companies either are too large to be housed adequately in 2 World Trade Center (such as Facebook or Google), or conclude it would save money to remain where they are (such as News Corp and Fox Corporation).

Bloomberg Business reported on June 2, 2015, that News Corp and 21st Century Fox, both owned by Rupert Murdoch, had signed a non-binding agreement with the Port Authority of New York and New Jersey to create a joint headquarters at Two World Trade Center. Silverstein said, "A decision by 21st Century Fox and News Corp. to move to the new World Trade Center would cap a seismic shift that has taken place in Lower Manhattan over the past decade. This isn't your grandfather's Wall Street." The change of lead architects, from Norman Foster to Bjarke Ingels, was dependent on the Murdoch companies' relocations to the site; a redesign was deemed necessary given the different requirements for TV studios as opposed to financial companies, the assumed major tenants for the Foster design. Ingels's design would be kept at the same height as Foster's, but it was unclear how the redesign would conflict with the below-grade work already completed, which conformed to the original building design. On January 15, 2016, it was reported that the two companies had decided against moving into 2 World Trade Center, instead keeping their current headquarters on the Avenue of the Americas. They had concluded that "given the scale of investment in a relocation of this size, that  our resources would be better directed elsewhere."

In September 2017, Deutsche Bank was considering relocating their U.S. headquarters to 2 WTC, signing on as anchor tenant once their lease expires at their current location along nearby 60 Wall Street. However, in May 2018, it was announced the bank was instead relocating to Time Warner Center at Columbus Circle.

See also

List of tallest buildings in New York City

References

External links 

, WTC.com
Bjarke Ingels Group (BIG) page on the new design for Two World Trade Center

2010 architecture
Bjarke Ingels buildings
Buildings and structures destroyed in the September 11 attacks
Buildings and structures under construction in the United States
Foster and Partners buildings
Proposed buildings and structures in New York City
Proposed skyscrapers in the United States
Skyscraper office buildings in Manhattan
World Trade Center